The 2015–16 Rice Owls men's basketball team represented Rice University during the 2015–16 NCAA Division I men's basketball season. The Owls, led by second year head coach Mike Rhoades, played their home games at Tudor Fieldhouse and were members of Conference USA. They finished the season 12–20, 7–11 in C-USA play to finish in a three-way tie for ninth place. They lost in the second round of the C-USA tournament to Charlotte.

Previous season
The Owls finished the season 12–20, 8–10 in C-USA play to finish in a four-way tie for seventh place. They advanced to the quarterfinals of the C-USA tournament where they lost to Louisiana Tech.

Departures

Recruiting class of 2015

Roster

Schedule

|-
!colspan=9 style="background:#002469; color:#5e6062;"| Exhibition

|-
!colspan=9 style="background:#002469; color:#5e6062;"| Non-conference regular season

|-
!colspan=9 style="background:#002469; color:#5e6062;"| C-USA Regular season

|-
!colspan=9 style="background:#002469; color:#5e6062;"| Conference USA tournament

See also
2015–16 Rice Owls women's basketball team

References

Rice Owls men's basketball seasons
Rice